The Ohio Valley Premier League (OVPL) is a USASA-affiliated league through US Club Soccer that includes teams from Indiana, Kentucky, Ohio, Pennsylvania, and West Virginia. The regular season of the OVPL runs May through July. It is the only premier U23 adult amateur league in the region.

The men's division was announced in November 2019 and the women's division was announced in February 2020. Both were due to begin play in summer 2020. Due to the COVID-19 pandemic, the summer season was cancelled and a fall season was started. In 2021, the OVPL also hosted a spring season.

Background
The OVPL is a competitive soccer circuit to offer the only amateur competition throughout the Ohio Valley (Indiana, Kentucky, Ohio, Pennsylvania, West Virginia) region.

The Ohio Valley Premier League (OVPL) has received sanctioning from US Club Soccer and is set to kick off in May 2020. A first of its kind in the region, the OVPL will seek to provide a competitive league for players of all ages, beginning with a competitive amateur men's division.

As a league, the OVPL will operate within Indiana, Kentucky, Ohio, Pennsylvania, and West Virginia to help local communities grow the beautiful game through competitive matches and local soccer culture. The amateur men's division allows for players as young as sixteen (16) years old to compete in a structure that provides an opportunity for competition in the country's longest-running tournament in the Lamar Hunt US Open Cup. Due to the structure of the OVPL, no players will jeopardize amateur status within their youth clubs, high schools, or universities.

With the sanctioning of the OVPL through US Club Soccer, the regionalized league is a first of its kind for the Ohio Valley area.

Clubs

Current 
Men's Division

Women's Division

Former

Champions

Summer season is split into Valley and River Divisions.

Notable players
 Enrico del Rosario (Northern Kentucky FC), 2021-present, Northern Mariana Islands National Team
 Manny Adjei, 2021-present, USA 6 National Team
 Kalu Abass (Northern Kentucky FC), 2021-present, member of MASL Cincinnati Swerve
 Andrej Novakovic (Northern Kentucky FC), 2020-present, member of MASL Cincinnati Swerve since 2021
 Bryce Day (Northern Kentucky FC), 2021-present, member of Cincinnati Dutch Lions FC in 2019
 Andrew Norman (soccer player) (Northern Kentucky FC), 2021-present, member of Cincinnati Swerve PASL from 2017-20
 Ryan Gray (Northern Kentucky FC), 2021-present, member of Cincinnati Swerve PASL from 2017-21
 Sean Eubanks (Northern Kentucky FC), 2020-present, member of Cincinnati Swerve PASL since 2020
 Paul Nicholson (footballer) (Kings Hammer U23), 2020, retired football who played in the United Soccer League from 2011 to 2017.

Notable former players
 Jacob Goodall, Kings Hammer SC - 2021, signed in 2021 by Greenville Triumph SC
 Cameron Cool, Lexington Landsharks - 2020, signed in 2020 by SC Hansa von 1911 e.V
 Rizwaan Dharsey, Kings Hammer SC - 2021, signed in 2021 by Vitória Futebol Clube - Pico
 Max Miller, Lexington Landsharks - 2021, signed in 2022 by FC Cincinnati 2
 Mohammedi Alkhateeb, West Virginia Highlanders FC - 2021, signed in 2022 by KF Trepça
 Josue Dubon, Evansville Legends FC - 2021, signed in 2023 by AD Chalatenango
 Diallo Irakoze, Lexington Landsharks - 2020, signed in 2023 by Lexington Sporting Club
 Abubakar Kasule, Northern Kentucky Nitro FC - 2022, signed in 2022 by Express FC

References

External links 
 Ohio Valley Premier League website

United States Adult Soccer Association leagues
Soccer in Indiana
Soccer in Kentucky
Soccer in Ohio
Regional Soccer leagues in the United States
Soccer leagues in the United States